International Journal of Music Education is a quarterly peer-reviewed academic journal covering the field of music education. The editors-in-chief are Jane Southcott (Monash University), S. Alex Ruthmann (New York University). It was established in 1983 and is currently published by SAGE Publications on behalf of the International Society for Music Education.

Abstracting and indexing
International Journal of Music Education is abstracted and indexed in:
 Academic Search Premier
 Arts & Humanities Citation Index
 British Education Index
 Current Contents/Arts & Humanities
 Current Contents/Social and Behavioral Sciences
 Educational Research Abstracts Online
 ERIC
 Scopus
 Social Sciences Citation Index

External links

LVL Music Academy

SAGE Publishing academic journals
English-language journals
Music education journals
Quarterly journals
Publications established in 1983